The 1994 FIFA World Cup OFC–CONMEBOL qualification play-off was a two-legged home-and-away tie between the winners of the Oceania qualifying tournament and CONCACAF–OFC play-off winners, Australia, and the second-placed team from the CONMEBOL Group 1, Argentina.

Overview 
The games were played on 31 October and 17 November 1993 in Sydney and Buenos Aires respectively. Australia was hoping to play in the FIFA World Cup for the first time since 1974, and Argentina was hoping to qualify after reaching the FIFA World Cup Final three times in the previous four FIFA World Cups. The only time that Argentina failed to qualify for a FIFA World Cup was in 1970. This qualification play-off notably immediately followed Argentina's 5–0 defeat by Colombia at home in Buenos Aires on 5 September 1993. The crowd of 43,967 who watched the first leg played at the Sydney Football Stadium was at the time a stadium record crowd for any sporting event.

The series were notable for being the first time Argentina had to play a qualification play-off match in their history. Moreover, the series saw the return of Diego Maradona to the national team after a long dispute with manager Alfio Basile. Some years later, Maradona suggested that drug tests were deliberately avoided during the series, stating that "to play against Australia, the Association gave us a 'fast coffee'" to drink before the match.

Background

Match details

First leg

Second leg

Notes

Broadcasting rights 
 : SBS
  Argentina: Canal 9, NexTV! & TeleRed (Only first leg are broadcast live); Eltrece, Canal 30 & Nuevo Siglo Cable TV (Only second leg are broadcast live)

References

1993 in Australian soccer
Play-off CONCOCAF-OFC
P2
World Cup 1994
1993
Qual
Soccer in Sydney
FIFA World Cup qualification inter-confederation play-offs
International association football competitions hosted by Argentina
International association football competitions hosted by Australia
Sports competitions in Buenos Aires
Sports competitions in Sydney
1990s in Sydney
1990s in Buenos Aires
October 1993 sports events in Australia
November 1993 sports events in South America
Football in Buenos Aires